Kossivi Jean d'Arc Amédédjisso (born 31 December 2001) is a footballer who plays as a midfielder for RB Leipzig. Born in Belgium, he represents Togo at international level.

International career
Born in Belgium, Amédédjisso is of Togolese descent. Amédédjisso made his professional debut for the Togo national football team in a 2021 Africa Cup of Nations qualification 1-1 tie with Kenya on 18 November 2019.

References

External links
 FDB Profile

2001 births
Living people
Sportspeople from Charleroi
Footballers from Hainaut (province)
Citizens of Togo through descent
Togolese footballers
Togo international footballers
Belgian footballers
Belgian people of Togolese descent
Belgian sportspeople of African descent
Black Belgian sportspeople
RB Leipzig players
Togolese expatriate footballers
Belgian expatriate footballers
Expatriate footballers in Germany
Association football midfielders
Belgian expatriate sportspeople in Germany
Togolese expatriate sportspeople in Germany